In organic chemistry, an iminium cation is a polyatomic ion with the general structure . They are common in synthetic chemistry and biology.

Structure
Iminium cations adopt alkene-like geometries.  The central C=N unit is nearly coplanar with all four substituents.  The C=N distances, which are near 129 picometers in length, are shorter than C-N single bonds.  Cis/trans isomers are observed.

Formation
Iminium cations are obtained by protonation and alkylation of imines:
RN=CR'_2  +  H+  ->  [RNH=CR'_2]+
RN=CR'_2 + R''+ -> [RR''N=CR'_2]+

They also are generated by the condensation of secondary amines with ketones or aldehydes:
O=CR'_2  +  R2NH  +  H+  <=> [R2N=CR'_2]+  +  H2O
This rapid, reversible reaction is one step in "iminium catalysis".

More exotic routes to iminium cations are known, e.g. from ring-opening reactions of pyridine.

Occurrence
Iminium derivatives are common in biology. Pyridoxal phosphate reacts with amino acids to give iminium derivatives. Many iminium salts are encountered in synthetic organic chemistry.

Reactions
Iminium salts hydrolyse to give the corresponding ketone or aldehyde:
[RR''N=CR'_2]+  +  H2O  -> [RR''NH2]+  +  O=CR'_2

Iminium cations are readily reduced to the amines, e.g. by sodium cyanoborohydride.  They are intermediates in the reductive amination of ketones and aldehydes.

Named reactions involving iminium species
Aza-Cope rearrangement
Beckmann rearrangement
Duff reaction
Mannich reaction
Pictet-Spengler reaction
Stephen aldehyde synthesis
Stork enamine alkylation
Vilsmeier-Haack reaction and Vilsmeier reagent

Iminylium ions
Iminylium ions have the general structure R2C=N+. They form a subclass of nitrenium ions.

See also
Ammonium
Imine
Quaternary ammonium cation

References

Functional groups
Chemistry suffixes